Ernesto Torres (born 12 December 1959) is a Puerto Rican athlete. He competed in the men's triple jump at the 1988 Summer Olympics.

References

External links
 

1959 births
Living people
Athletes (track and field) at the 1979 Pan American Games
Athletes (track and field) at the 1987 Pan American Games
Athletes (track and field) at the 1988 Summer Olympics
Puerto Rican male triple jumpers
Olympic track and field athletes of Puerto Rico
Place of birth missing (living people)
Pan American Games medalists in athletics (track and field)
Pan American Games bronze medalists for Puerto Rico
Medalists at the 1987 Pan American Games
Central American and Caribbean Games medalists in athletics
Central American and Caribbean Games bronze medalists for Puerto Rico
Competitors at the 1986 Central American and Caribbean Games